(Ecclesiastical Latin for "Go back, Satan" or "Step back, Satan", "Back off, Satan") is a medieval Western Christian formula for exorcism, recorded in a 1415 manuscript found in the Benedictine Metten Abbey in Bavaria; its origin is traditionally associated with the Benedictines. The initials of this formula (VRSNSMV SMQLIVB or VRS:NSMV:SMQL:IVB) have often been engraved around crucifixes or Western Christian Saint Benedict Medals at least since 1780.

The phrase  (often spelled , or ) is also used as a witty or scholarly prose device, dissociated from its religious implications, to express strong rejection of an unacceptable (but possibly tempting) proposal, or dread of some looming menace.  Namely, in the sense of "do not tempt me!", "I will have nothing to do with that", "will someone deliver us from that", and so on.

Text

The Ecclesiastical Latin text says:

In approximate translation:

"May the Holy Cross be my light / May the dragon never be my guide
Begone Satan / Never tempt me with your vanities 
What you offer me is evil / drink the poison yourself."

Origins and history
	
The verse VADE RETRO SATANA is similar to a phrase spoken by Jesus to Peter in the Vulgate New Testament, Gospel of Mark :  ("Get behind me, Satan!"). 

The exact origin of the passage is not clear. It is found in an early thirteenth century legend of the Devil's Bridge at Sens, wherein an architect sold his soul to the devil and then subsequently repented. M. le Curé of Sens, wearing his stole, exorcised the devil, driving him away with holy water and these words, which he made the penitent repeat.
 
The passage came to general attention in 1647, when women who were prosecuted for witchcraft declared that they had been unable to do harm where there was a cross, and the St. Michael's Benedictine Abbey in Metten was particularly exempt from their influence. A search of the monastery turned up crosses painted on the walls with the formula's initials. The meaning of those letters remained a mystery for some time, until the complete verses were found in a manuscript dating to 1415 in the abbey's library, next to an image of St. Benedict. 

The same formula was later found in an Austrian manuscript from 1340/50.  The manuscript depicts Satan offering a drinking cup to the Saint, who keeps him at bay with a long cross-topped staff carrying a red banner. Below the staff is a single line of text, and below it are six lines of verse, starting with "".

The formula received the approval of Pope Benedict XIV, and became part of the Roman Catholic ritual in 1742. The formula's popularity grew considerably in the 19th century, mainly due to the efforts of Leo Dupont. According to H. C. Lea (1896), "As a rule ... it suffices to wear [the medal] devoutly, but, if some special favor is desired, it is advisable on a Tuesday to say five Glorias, three Aves and then three more Glorias to secure the protection of St. Benedict." 

The  remains part of the Roman Catholic ritual following the 20th-century revision of the ritual and its final promulgation in 1999 via .

See also
 Apage

References

Notes

Citations

Benedictines
Amulets
Exorcism in the Catholic Church
Latin religious words and phrases
Incantation